Aw-li On-nam Ot-tjin (or simply Otjin) is a traditional mancala game played by the Penihing people of Borneo. The first transcription of the rules of the game is due to norwegian ethnographist Carl Sofus Lumholtz. Despite its origin, Otjin is similar to african mancalas such as Ba-awa (Ghana) and quite different from most Asian mancalas.

Rules
The Otjin board comprises two rows of 10 holes each. Each player owns a row of holes. At game setup, each of smaller holes holds an equal number of seeds, usually 3 (but 2 to 5 are admissible).

At his or her turn, the player takes all the seeds from one of his holes and relay sows them counterclockwise. If the last seed is sown in a hole such that, after sowing, the number of seeds in the hole is equal to the number of seeds per hole at the beginning of the game (e.g., 3), the player captures those seeds and removes them from the game. Capture is traditionally called "fishing".

When one of the players cannot play anymore, his or her opponent captures all the seeds that are left on the board, and the game ends. The winner of the game is the player who captured most seeds.

References
R. Gering, Otjin: Trying to make fish. In «Abstract Games Magazine», 4 (14), 2003, pp. 10, 15.
Carl Lumholtz, Through Central Borneo: An Account of Two Years' Travel in the Land of the Head-Hunters between the Years 1913-1917, Vol 2. pp 435-437. Charles Scribner's Sons, New York 1920.
L. Russ, The Complete Mancala Games Book: How to play the World's oldest Board Games. Marlowe & Company, New York 2000.

Traditional mancala games
Borneo